Schizostachyum aciculare is a species of bamboo in the tribe Bambuseae of the family Poaceae.  The recorded range of this species is Indo-China to Peninsula Malaysia and Borneo.  In Vietnam it may be called mung or nứa.

References 

aciculare
Flora of Indo-China
Flora of Malesia